Weldon Branch is a stream in Gentry County in the U.S. state of Missouri.

Weldon Branch has the name of John Weldon, an early settler.

See also
List of rivers of Missouri

References

Rivers of Gentry County, Missouri
Rivers of Missouri